Jorge Alfredo González (born September 30, 1977 in Argentina) is an Argentine footballer who currently pays for Barracas Central in the Argentine Primera B Metropolitana.

Club career
In August, 2010 he was transferred from Puerto Rican side River Plate to Barracas Central.

References

External links
 

Living people
Argentine footballers
1988 births
Association football forwards
Cienciano footballers
Club Atlético River Plate Puerto Rico players
Barracas Central players
Footballers from Buenos Aires